"Save a Prayer" is the sixth single by the English new wave band Duran Duran, released on 9 August 1982. The song was the third single taken from their second album Rio (1982). It became Duran Duran's biggest hit (at the time) on the UK Singles Chart, reaching number two, held out of the top spot by Survivor's "Eye of the Tiger".

It was not originally issued as a single in the United States, although the music video was very popular on MTV. A special US single version was finally released in January 1985 and reached number 16 on the Billboard Hot 100.

Composition
The song began with Andy Taylor and Nick Rhodes picking out chords together, and was then built around the sequencer track. Simon Le Bon wrote the lyrics to the song while the band was on tour. The lyrics are about a chance meeting between two people that turns into a one-night stand. Le Bon has described the lyrics as "realistic, and not romantic". According to Le Bon, the chorus of the song was based on Gordon Lightfoot's folk song "If You Could Read My Mind".

The verses of the song are in D minor, while the chorus is in B minor. It opens with an arpeggiated delay-treated synthesizer riff (created on a Roland SH-2), which plays in the background throughout the song.

Critical reception
Cash Box said that the live version "attests to the faithful sound of Duran Duran’s show while betraying a certain sedimentary element of the arrangement, the harmonies are there as are the lush backing synthesizers, yet a muddy mix makes the original studio cut favorable."

AllMusic journalist Donald A. Guarisco described the new wave ballad in a retrospective review, as being "a lilting epic". He wrote: "The music maintains the stormily romantic quality of the lyric by combining meditative verses with an aching chorus that swells and ebbs in a way that perfectly captures the song's heartbreak."

Music video
The video was filmed by director Russell Mulcahy among the jungles, beaches, and temples of Sri Lanka in April 1982. Scenes were filmed atop the ancient rock fortress of Sigiriya, among the ruins of a Buddhist temple at Polonnaruwa and the island's southern coastline, with Simon Le Bon appearing in Speedos.

The shoot was a difficult but memorable experience for the band. Simon Le Bon and Roger and John Taylor went ahead to the location while Andy Taylor and Nick Rhodes were in London finishing mixes for the Rio album and B sides. They had almost no time after that was done to change clothes before catching their flight, and Rhodes wore the same leather jacket and trousers he had been wearing against the London chill.

When they arrived in Colombo, it was very warm, and Rhodes was uncomfortable in his clothing. Taylor reassured him they would be in their hotel soon and could relax. The driver who met them in a flatbed lorry informed them it would be several hours' driving time to Kandy in the centre of the country, where the band were lodged. Along the way they were struck by the poverty they witnessed.

During the filming of the scene where the band members were riding elephants, a female elephant made a strange sound. One of the crew had recorded it, and found it funny enough to play back. It turned out to be the elephant's mating call, which led the elephant carrying Roger Taylor to charge downhill and attempt to mount the female. "It was funny as hell, but quite hairy for a moment," says Rhodes.

While perched on a branch over a lagoon and miming playing his guitar, an intoxicated Andy Taylor fell into the water. He accidentally swallowed some, and had to be hospitalized during the band's subsequent Australian tour due to a tropical virus he contracted at that time. The band members all initially refused to do the scene where an elephant sprays water from its trunk onto one of them due to its homoerotic overtones; they finally settled on John Taylor since he was the band's pin-up boy. He would be teased about it for years afterwards. "I didn't care," he wrote in 2012. "I loved it. It is one of my most treasured memories."
 
Andy Taylor recalls in his memoirs that the shooting at the temple was very tense, since the country was on the verge of civil war and the temple's monks were impatiently waiting for their leader to arrive and address a large political gathering. The band members wore bare feet in deference to the temple's religious importance, frequently scorching themselves on the bare rock they were standing on. During some takes, the band members yelled "Fuck you, Russell!" instead of mouthing the lyrics. For one scene, Le Bon and Rhodes were dropped off from a helicopter that could not itself land on the monument.

A live version of the song was released in 1985. On the live version Simon Le Bon dedicates the song to Marvin Gaye, who had been fatally shot the day before the concert was recorded in April 1984. The video was taken from Duran Duran's Oakland, California concerts that were filmed for the Arena (An Absurd Notion) video.

B-sides, bonus tracks and remixes
The UK release of "Save a Prayer" was backed with a remix of "Hold Back the Rain".

Complete list of versions 
 "Save a Prayer" [Single Version] – 5:24
 "Save a Prayer" [Album Version] – 5:33
 "Save a Prayer" [Video Version] – 6:03
 "Save a Prayer" [Australian Promo Edit] – 4:10
 "Save a Prayer" [Brazilian Edit] – 4:04
 "Save a Prayer" [US Single version] – 3:44
 "Save a Prayer" [Special Edited version] – 3:55
 "Save a Prayer" [Japanese Single version] – 4:00
 song differences 
 Single Version: at approximately 4:35 "Save a prayer 'til the morning after" is repeated 4 times until fade out.
 Album Version: at approximately 4:35 "Save a prayer 'til the morning after" is repeated 6 times until fade out.
 Video Version: at approximately 4:41 "Save a prayer 'til the morning after" is repeated 12 times until fade out.
 The synthesizer riff in the Video Version is repeated 4 times during the intro, while the synthesizer riff on the album and single version gets repeated only twice.

Formats and track listing

7": EMI. / EMI 5327 United Kingdom
 "Save a Prayer" – 5:25
 "Hold Back the Rain" (Remix) – 3:58

12": EMI. / 12 EMI 5327 United Kingdom
 "Save a Prayer" – 5:25 
 "Hold Back the Rain" (12'' Remix) – 7:05

7": Capitol Records. / B 5438 United States
 "Save a Prayer" – 3:45 (a.k.a. "US Single version") 
 "Save a Prayer" (From the Arena) – 3:35
 Track 2 is an edited version taken from the album Arena.

12": EMI Electrola. / 1C K 060 2005036 Europe
 "Save a Prayer" – 5:25
 "Save a Prayer" (From the Arena) – 6:11
 "Careless Memories" (From the Arena) – 4:06
 Tracks 2 & 3 are taken from the album Arena.

7": EMI. / EMI 1A 006-64953 The Netherlands
 "Save a Prayer" – 5:32
 "Hold Back the Rain" (Remix) – 3:56

CD: Part of Singles Box Set 1981–1985 boxset
 "Save A Prayer" (7" Edit) – 5:25
 "Hold Back the Rain" (Remix) – 3:56
 "Hold Back the Rain" (12'' Remix) – 7:05

Live version

"Save a Prayer (Live)" is the fourth track from the album Arena. Capitol Records released an edited version as B-side of the single "Save a Prayer" (US Single Version) in the United States in January 1985. The single peaked at number 16 on the Billboard Hot 100 for the week ending 16 March 1985.

The release was accompanied by a new live video, drawn from footage shot in 1984 for the concert film Arena.

Charts

Weekly charts

Year-end charts

As of October 2021 "Save a Prayer" is the sixth most streamed Duran Duran song in the UK.

Certifications

Other appearances
 1984	Arena
 1987	The Secret Policeman's Third Ball
 1987  Now Smash Hits
 1989	Decade
 1993	"Ordinary World" single
 1998	Greatest
 1999	Now That's What I Call Music!: 1982
 2001	Rio (reissue)
 2003	Singles Box Set 1981-1985
 2004	Singles Box Set 1986-1995
 2005	Live from London
 2009	Rio (2CD Collector's Edition)
 2009  Live at Hammersmith '82!
 2018  Bumblebee: The Movie
 2021  Sex Education (season 3, episode 2)

Personnel
Duran Duran:
Simon Le Bon – lead vocals, acoustic guitar (live)
Nick Rhodes – keyboards, synthesizers  
John Taylor – bass guitar, backing vocals
Roger Taylor – drums
Andy Taylor – guitar, backing vocals

Also credited:
Colin Thurston – producer and engineer

Cover versions

Eagles of Death Metal version

A cover version of the song appears on Eagles of Death Metal's 2015 album, Zipper Down. Duran Duran and Eagles of Death Metal played the song together on TFI Friday. Following the November 2015 Paris attacks, a Facebook campaign was launched to get the cover of "Save a Prayer" to number 1 on the UK Singles Chart. Duran Duran have stated that they will donate all their royalties from the cover to charity. Eagles of Death Metal's cover ultimately peaked at number 53 for the chart dated the week after the attack.

Weekly charts

Other versions
In 2014, singer-songwriter David Mead released a cover version of the song on the multi-artist compilation album Here Comes the Reign Again: The Second British Invasion.

In December 2019, Canadian electronic duo Bob Moses released a cover version of the song on their Unplugged EP.

In 2009, British singer-songwriter Kate Walsh released a cover version of the song on her album Peppermint Radio.

Sampling
 "Save a Prayer" is sampled throughout on Cosmic Belt's 2006 single "Do It".
 Will.i.am of The Black Eyed Peas sampled the song on the track "One More Chance", on his 2007 solo album Songs About Girls.
 Arctic Monkeys reference the song's chorus on the track "Teddy Picker", from their 2007 album Favourite Worst Nightmare.

References

External links
Save A Prayer at BBC's Sold on Song
VH1: Duran Duran videos – see a clip from the "Save A Prayer" video
The Duran Duran Timeline: 1982
The Duran Duran Timeline: 1985

1982 songs
1982 singles
1985 singles
2015 singles
Duran Duran songs
Eagles of Death Metal songs
Music videos directed by Russell Mulcahy
Song recordings produced by Colin Thurston
Songs written by Simon Le Bon
Songs written by John Taylor (bass guitarist)
Songs written by Roger Taylor (Duran Duran drummer)
Songs written by Andy Taylor (guitarist)
Songs written by Nick Rhodes
EMI Records singles
Capitol Records singles
Downtown Records singles
New wave ballads
Synth-pop ballads
1980s ballads